Diawala is a town in the far north of Ivory Coast. It is a sub-prefecture and commune of Ouangolodougou Department in Tchologo Region, Savanes District.

Diawala is the birthplace of Guillaume Soro.

In 2021, the population of the sub-prefecture of Diawala was 85,334.

Villages
The 17 villages of the sub-prefecture of Diawala and their population in 2014 are:

Notes

Sub-prefectures of Tchologo
Communes of Tchologo